Jean-Gilles Grare is a French sprint canoer.

Career
Grare competed from the late 1990s to the mid-2000s. He won a bronze medal in the C-4 500 m event at the 1999 ICF Canoe Sprint World Championships in Milan.

References

French male canoeists
Living people
Year of birth missing (living people)
ICF Canoe Sprint World Championships medalists in Canadian